Golela is a border town in Kwa-Zulu Natal Province, South Africa, 45 km east of Pongola on the border with Eswatini. The Golela border post was recently rebuilt to meet the increasing movement of people and goods between South Africa and Eswatini.

Overview
The border crossing is situated on the southern border of Eswatini, 145 km southeast of Piet Retief. The name is of Zulu origin, said to be named after Golela kaMantsholo Thabede who was a noble man of the Mahlalela clan who were living along uPhongolo river, below Ubombo mountains. Locals say that Golela used to confront the apartheid government authorities who were stationed at the border and was opposed to the border restrictions by the apartheid government of Transvaal. Before it was constructed by the Transvaal government, the border was long used by people many years ago before the arrival of European settlers. This was the hunting ground of the Mahlalela clan in former times. They would organize hunting expeditions and invite the neighboring Ntshangase, Nyawo, Mngomezulu and Buthelezi clans. Other hunters would come even as far as Zombodze in Eswatini. The portion of the town across the border, in Eswatini, was renamed Lavumisa.

Transport 
It is served by a railway station on the line connecting South Africa and Eswatini.

References

External links 
 Golela border post construction information

Eswatini–South Africa border crossings
Populated places in the uPhongolo Local Municipality